Steg is a former municipality in the district of Raron in the canton of Valais in Switzerland. Since 1 January 2009, Steg has been part of the enlarged municipality of Steg-Hohtenn.

References

External links
  
 

Former municipalities of Valais